Fallstein may refer to the following places in Saxony-Anhalt, Germany:

Großer Fallstein, a wooded region north of the Harz mountains
Aue-Fallstein, a municipality in the district of Harz